Dirt Track Racing: Sprint Cars is a sprint car racing video game by the now defunct Ratbag Games. It is the second game of the dirt track racing series by Ratbag, which includes Dirt Track Racing (DTR), Dirt Track Racing: Sprint Cars, and Dirt Track Racing 2 (DTR2).

Background
Dirt Track Racing: Sprint Cars, or DTRSC for short, was one of the first authentic sprint car, dirt track racing simulations in the video game market.

Game modes

Single-player

Career
In the Career Mode, players race through their careers, earning money to upgrade their cars.  Success brings more money, and sponsors, which help pay the bills. Unlike in most other racing games, players can enter any division of racing they choose. The higher the series, the stronger the competition, so a player in the first or second season usually will not advance beyond the B-Main in the top flight of Sprint Car Racing. The only restrictions are that only one race can be entered per weekend, and the track selected being within an unlocked distance from a racer's garage.

Quick Action
In the Quick Action Mode, players race against computer artificial intelligence (AI) players in regular races consisting of heats and features in short mode, or full racing programs consisting of hot laps, qualifying, heats, semi-features (B-, C-, D-Mains), and features (A-Mains).

Multiplayer
In Multiplayer Mode, players could race other players from all over the world via GameSpy Client-Servers, which have since been shut down.

Movie maker
Software included in Dirt Track Racing: Sprint Cars allows for the exporting of video clips of game action in AVI format. This is the first game in the Ratbag DTR franchise that allows movies to be exported from the game.

Unsupported features
One of the most used unsupported features is the ability for users to create skins, cars, and tracks easily with outside software. Some players have even found software that allows them to change the .DE2 files to create entirely new cars and tracks, instead of just renaming existing cars.

Reception

The game received "generally favorable reviews" according to the review aggregation website Metacritic.

References

External links
Ratbag Games: Last version of Ratbag Games official website reproduced by Australian video game website Sumea for archives purposes.

2000 video games
Racing video games
Video games developed in Australia
Windows games
Windows-only games
Multiplayer and single-player video games
WizardWorks games